Jack E. White (July 24, 1921 – July 2, 1988) was an American physician and cancer surgeon. He was the first black physician to train in surgical oncology at Memorial Sloan Kettering Cancer Center. White later directed the cancer center at Howard University College of Medicine where he also served as a full professor. He was elected to the Institute of Medicine in 1977 and he served as president of the American Cancer Society.

Early life and education 
Born in Stuart, Florida, White attended Florida A&M College, Howard University College of Medicine, and Memorial Sloan Kettering Cancer Center. White was a World War II veteran. He trained at the Freedmen's Hospital in Washington, D.C. and at Memorial Hospital in Manhattan before taking a faculty position at Howard. At Memorial Sloan Kettering, White became the first black physician to complete training in surgical oncology at the institution that had been founded in 1884 and is a leader in cancer research and treatment.

Career 
In 1951, White joined the faculty at Howard. He was a full professor by 1963. White became director of Howard's cancer center as well as its cancer training and research programs.  He served on drug advisory panels for the Food and Drug Administration and he was a consultant to several foreign countries, including Cuba, Ethiopia, and Hatti. 

Among other physicians White mentored, was LaSalle D. Leffall Jr., who also went on to specialty training at Memorial Sloan Kettering, became a Howard faculty member, and was elected president of the American Cancer Society.

White was known as an expert on cancers among black patients. His research showed that black patients died of cancer at high rates and he found that many of those deaths could have been prevented with earlier detection and treatment.

Post retirement 
After retiring from Howard in 1986, White continued to serve as a cancer adviser to groups in Washington, D.C.

Honors 
In 1977, White was elected to the Institute of Medicine. He was recognized by the American Cancer Society for "outstanding service to the cause of cancer control". Howard University awarded its Distinguished Alumni Achievement Award to White in March 1988.

Personal 
White died of cancer in 1988. He was survived by his wife, Sara, and five children.

References 

1921 births
1988 deaths
American surgeons
Howard University faculty
Howard University College of Medicine alumni
Florida A&M University alumni
Members of the National Academy of Medicine
American Book Award winners
20th-century surgeons